Things I Left in Havana is a 1997 Spanish film directed by Manuel Gutiérrez Aragón and co-written by Senel Paz. It stars Violeta Rodríguez, Jorge Perugorría and Kiti Mánver.

Plot 
Three sisters from Cuba (Nena, Ludmila and Rosa) move to Madrid, temporarily staying with their aunt María, who exploits them for labour, also intending for them to assimilate to Spanish culture. Nena, an actress wannabe, falls romantically for Igor, a Cuban scoundrel with a heart of gold.

Cast

Production 
The screenplay was penned by Manuel Gutiérrez Aragón and Senel Paz. Produced by Gerardo Herrero, the film is a Sogetel and Tornasol Films production, with the participation of Canal+ and the collaboration of Sogepac. The film had a budget slightly over 200 million ₧.

Release 
Things I Left in Havana screened at the 42nd Valladolid International Film Festival in October 1997. The film was theatrically released in Spain on 16 January 1998.

Accolades 

|-
| align = "center" | 1997 || 42nd Valladolid International Film Festival || colspan = "2" | Silver Spike ||  || 
|-
| align = "center" rowspan = "2" | 1998 || 13th Goya Awards || Best New Actress || Violeta Rodríguez ||  || 
|-
| 45th Ondas Awards || Best Film Director || Manuel Gutiérrez Aragón ||  || 
|}

See also 
 List of Spanish films of 1998

References 

Films set in Madrid
Films about immigration to Spain
1997 films
1990s Spanish-language films
Spanish drama films
1997 drama films
Tornasol Films films
1990s Spanish films